Rovellasca is a comune (municipality) in the Province of Como in the Italian region Lombardy, located about  northwest of Milan and about  south of Como.

Rovellasca borders the following municipalities: Bregnano, Lazzate, Lomazzo, Misinto, Rovello Porro.

Physician and zoologist Giovanni Battista Grassi was born in Rovellasca.

References

External links
Official website

Cities and towns in Lombardy